Yarela Nicohl Gómez Sánchez (born 8 June 1990) is a Chilean teacher who was elected as a member of the Chilean Constitutional Convention.

References

External links
 

Living people
21st-century Chilean politicians
Social Convergence politicians
Members of the Chilean Constitutional Convention
Austral University of Chile alumni
21st-century Chilean women politicians
1990 births